A bill of rights, or the Bill of Rights, is a declaration of the rights that a citizenry have.

It may also refer to:
Declaration of Right, 1689, a document, given as a speech, that declared the rights all citizens of England should have
Bill of Rights 1689, the bill of rights passed by the Parliament of England, as amended several times
United States Bill of Rights, written 1789, ratified 1791
Declaration of the Rights of Man and of the Citizen, 1789 French document
Second Bill of Rights, proposals by United States President Franklin D. Roosevelt in 1944
Universal Declaration of Human Rights, 1948 United Nations document
Canadian Bill of Rights, an Act of the Canadian Parliament in 1960
International Bill of Human Rights, 1976 United Nations document
Canadian Charter of Rights and Freedoms, in the Canadian Constitution of 1982
New Zealand Bill of Rights Act 1990
Hong Kong Bill of Rights Ordinance, a Hong Kong ordinance enacted in 1991

See also
 Bill of Rights Bill (proposed legislation in the United Kingdom)
 Consumer Bill of Rights
 Homeless Bill of Rights
 Taxpayer Bill of Rights
 Academic Bill of Rights 
 Veterans' Bill of Rights
 G.I. Bill of Rights, better known as the G.I. Bill
 Homosexual Bill of Rights, drafted by North American Conference of Homophile Organizations
 Library Bill of Rights, published by the American Library Association
 Environmental Bill of Rights or Agenda 21
 Creator's Bill of Rights, comic writers and artists
 Donor's Bill of Rights, for philanthropic donors
 Law Enforcement Officers' Bill of Rights
 California Voter Bill of Rights, adaptation of the Voting Rights Act
 Islamic Bill of Rights for Women in the Mosque
 New Jersey Anti-Bullying Bill of Rights Act
 Credit Cardholders' Bill of Rights, contained within the Credit CARD Act of 2009
 Sexual Assault Survivors' Bill of Rights (Sexual Assault Survivors' Rights Act)